The Twelfth Texas Legislature met from February 8, 1870, to December 2, 1871, in four sessions — provisional, called, regular, and adjourned.

Senate
There were incidents with Indian marauders and cattle thieves in Texas and on May 6, 1870, Senator Theodor Rudolph Hertzberg introduced a bill to reorganize the state militia. The bill included provisions for a unique "state guard" and for martial law. David Webster Flanagan who had for years been a staunch Radical Republican opposed the bill because of its clauses allowing Governor Edmund J. Davis to impose martial law. The cost was also the reason why some Republicans opposed the bill, but Senator Matthew Gaines, an African American, believed that racism was the reason for opposition, since many of the "state guard" would be black.  

On May 17, at a Republican caucus, Senators Bolivar Jackson Pridgen and E. L. Alford announced their opposition to the bill and were thrown out of the meeting. Governor Davis announced that he would veto any bills which came across his desk before his militia legislation. Flanagan then offered to support the state militia bill if Governor Davis supported a railroad bill, but Davis publicly refused.

On June 16, 1870, Flanagan put forward a substitute militia bill without the martial law sections, but it failed to pass.  Senator Mijamin Priest then publicly supported a bill which had passed the house, which would have suspended the writ of habeas corpus. In a public debate on June 17, Priest said that Texas was in a state of war with Indians and bandits, insisting that "a desperate disease requires a desperate remedy."

On June 21, Flanagan attempted to introduce his previous defeated bill as an alternative to the house bill which suspended the writ of habeas corpus. This motion failed. Flanagan then attempted to adjourn. According to a sworn statement by Parsons, Senator Fountain moved for a vote on the bill by roll. Thirteen Senators, Marmion Henry Bowers, Flanagan, Alford, E. Thomas Broughton, Amos Clark, David W. Cole, Ebenezer Lafayette Dohoney, James Postell Douglas, Andrew J. Evans, Henry Russell Latimer, Edward Bradford Pickett, William H. Pyle, and George R. Shannon, withdrew from the chamber to prevent the presence of a quorum and to prevent passage of the bill, to a nearby Capitol committee room.

The Senate rule at the time, as it is today, states that the sergeant-at-arms could be sent to arrest absent senators to secure a quorum. The Senate sergeant-at-arms was sent to retrieve them with instructions to retrieve at least four senators, the number required for a quorum. Because the senators had locked the door, the sergeant-at-arms flung himself through a committee room window despite the efforts of the Senators to close the shutter on him. The sergeant-at-arms convinced the senators to return to the chamber. The Radical Republicans then had their opponents arrested. Nine were immediately arrested, but four of the Senators remained, so the Senate could form a quorum. The Rump Senate then moved forward the militia bill. The next day, one of the Senators pleaded illness, so one of the jailed senators was released so the militia bill could be passed.

The term Rump Senate is applied to the fifteen Radical Republican members of the Twelfth Texas Legislature, the term is a variation of "rump legislature".  It is the only time in history where senators were arrested under a "call of the Senate" and were then prohibited from rejoining their fellow senators and participating in Senate votes.

During the confinement the Rump Senate took full advantage of their absence to pass as many of Governor Davis's bills as could be rushed through legislature.  The House bill to establish a state police was passed on June 28, 1870. The Senate confirmed James Davidson as adjutant general who later stole thirty thousand dollars of state money.

Several senators were held under arrest for three weeks while the Rump Senate passed the legislation and began hearings against the senators for not only walking out of the chamber, but for other allegations, including bribery for Senate votes. Flanagan, who was responsible for most of the incident, was too powerful a figure to be penalized. But Senator E.L. Alford of La Grange lost his Senate seat after an investigatory committee ruled that he "did, in contempt of the Senate, violently resist said arrest, and did forcibly close the shutters, and did refuse to submit to said arrest by the Sergeant-at-arms."

As soon as he was released from jail, Alford continued to take his seat in the Senate, and even after the special election, refused to give up his seat. Reinhard Hillebrand, his elected replacement, had to wait in the wings.

Sessions
 12th Provisional session: February 8–24, 1870
 Legislative members eligible to take the qualifying oath were required to convene February 8, 1870, to ratify the Fourteenth and Fifteenth Amendments to the United States Constitution in order for Texas to be readmitted to the Union, and to elect two U.S. Senators. Both houses of the legislature were required to adjourn daily until all members had qualified.
 12th Called session: April 26–August 15, 1870
 12th Regular session: January 10–May 31, 1871
 12th Adjourned session: September 12–December 2, 1871

Party summary

Officers

Senate
 Lieutenant Governor James W. Flanagan (Provisional) 
 President pro tempore (Lieutenant Governor ex officio)
 Donald Campbell, Republican, Called Session, Regular Session
 David Webster Flanagan, Republican, Adjourned Session
 Albert Jennings Fountain, Republican, Adjourned Session
 David Webster Flanagan, Republican, Adjourned Session

 Flanagan was elected Lieutenant Governor in 1869. He was declared "Provisional Lieutenant Governor" by Special Order No. 6, Fifth Military District, on January 8, 1870, and presided over the Provisional session of the Senate. During that session, he was elected to the U.S. Senate and was never sworn in as Lieutenant Governor.

House of Representatives
 Speaker of the House
 Ira Hobart Evans, Republican, 1870–1871
 William Henry Sinclair, Republican, 1871–1873

Members
Members of the Twelfth Texas Legislature at the beginning of the provisional session, February 8, 1870:

Senate

  Petit did not attend the Provisional Session. He was sworn in on February 26, 1870, at the beginning of the Called Session.
  Evans refused to qualify on February 8, 1870, but did qualify and was sworn in on February 10, 1870.

House of Representatives

 Richard Allen
 James Buckner Barry
 D. W. Burley
 James Reid Cole
 Giles Cotton
 J. Goldsteen Dupree
 Ira Hobart Evans
 Jeremiah Hamilton
 Gustav Hoffmann

 Orlando Newton Hollingsworth
 Mitchell Kendall
 Fergus Kyle
 David Medlock
 John Mitchell
 Henry Moore
 Shepherd Mullens
 Henry Phelps
 Julius Schuetze
 William Sheriff Thirteenth District
 William Henry Sinclair
 William F. Schlottmann
 Richard Williams
 Benjamin Franklin Williams
Francis Gray Franks, District 13 Wharton
Richard Williams Walker County

Membership changes

  District 2: Swift elected in special election October 3–6, 1871.
  District 3: Dillard elected in special election November 28–December 1, 1870.
  District 3: Dillard reelected in special election October 3–6, 1871.
  District 26: Hillebrand elected in special election November 28–December 1, 1870.

See also
Rump legislature

Notes

External links

12 Texas Legislature
1870 in Texas
1871 in Texas
Texas Senate
1870 U.S. legislative sessions
1871 U.S. legislative sessions